Earlville is a city in LaSalle County, Illinois, United States. The population was 1,613 at the 2020 census, down from 1,701 at the 2010 census. The city is part of the Ottawa, IL Micropolitan Statistical Area.

History
The Earlville Post Office has been in operation since 1844. The city was named after Earlville, New York, the former hometown of an early settler.

Geography

Demographics

As of the 2020 census, there were 1,613 people, 886 households, and 542 families residing in the city. The racial makeup of the city was 90.8% White, 0.4% African American, 0.3% Native American, 0.3% Asian, 3.3% from other races, and 4.9% from two or more races. Hispanic or Latino of any race were 8.2% of the population.

There were 886 households, out of which 23.6% had children under the age of 18 living with them, 49.2% were married couples living together, 10.4% had a female householder with no husband present, and 38.8% were non-families. 32.8% of all households were made up of individuals, and 8.5% had someone living alone who was 65 years of age or older. The average household size was 2.32 and the average family size was 2.94.

In the city, the population was spread out, with 23.2% under the age of 18, 13.4% from 18 to 24, 23.5% from 25 to 44, 24.3% from 45 to 64, and 15.6% who were 65 years of age or older. The median age was 35.3 years. For every 100 females, there were 107.6 males. For every 100 females age 18 and over, there were 100.2 males.

The median income for a household in the city was $52,768, and the median income for a family was $70,603. Males had a median income of $40,804 versus $19,375 for females. The per capita income for the city was $23,334. About 5.5% of families and 11.5% of the population were below the poverty line of which 9.0% were under the age of 18 and 7.2% were aged 65 or over.

Earlville has a modern library, a K-12 school system, a bank, an ambulance and fire station, a weekly newspaper, a drive-in movie theater, and a number of local businesses. The area surrounding Earlville is strongly agricultural. Earlville lacks major shopping centers and industries.

Many of the inhabitants of Earlville work at blue-collar jobs. Earlville's population has declined somewhat over the past two decades. Several planned residential developments of moderate size were derailed by the nationwide housing crash that began in 2008.

Education
Earlville Community Unit School District #9 (CUSD #9) occupies a campus of school buildings on Union Street, a main thoroughfare and former route of US 34. The school has undergone many changes over the last several years, including the recent implementation of a new air conditioning system and re-doing of one of the gyms for the 2021-2022 school year. The campus includes Earlville Grade School, Earlville Junior High, and Earlville High School.  The administrative offices are within buildings on the site, which the Elementary, Junior High, and High School share.  On the site is also a cafeteria, 2 gymnasiums, and library.  The school Mascot is a Raider, stylized as a Pirate, with the school colors of Red and White.  The School is a part of the Little Ten Conference, which includes Earlville, Serena, Newark, Indian Creek (Shabbona/Waterman), DePue, Leland, Somonauk, LaMoille, Kirkland Hiawatha, Hinckley Big Rock, and most recently IMSA.
Earlville and Leland merged athletic programs in 2006, but separated again in 2018 after failing to come to an agreement regarding the co-op.

Notable people

 Steve Behel, MLB player for the Milwaukee Brewers and New York Mets
 Herbert O. Crisler, head football coach and athletic director at University of Michigan
 Frank Haven Hall, inventor of the Hall Braille Writer
 Bessie S. McColgin, Oklahoma state representative
 John J. Myers, Roman Catholic Archbishop of Newark, N.J
 Gary K. Wolf, author of the novel Who Censored Roger Rabbit?, which became the Movie Who Framed Roger Rabbit

References

Cities in Illinois
Ottawa, IL Micropolitan Statistical Area
Cities in LaSalle County, Illinois
1844 establishments in Illinois